Karns may refer to:

 Places

 Karns, Tennessee, United States
 Karns City, Pennsylvania, United States
 Karns, Pennsylvania, United States

 People

 Roscoe Karns (1891–1970), American actor
 Stephen Karns, American lawyer
 Todd Karns (1921–2000), American actor
 Virginia Karns (1907–1990), American singer and actress

 Companies

 Karns Quality Foods, a supermarket chain in Pennsylvania

See also 

 Karnes (disambiguation)